This is a list of members of the New South Wales Legislative Assembly who served in the 41st parliament held their seats from 1965 to 1968. They were elected at the 1965 state election, and at by-elections. The Speaker was Sir Kevin Ellis.

See also
First Askin ministry
Results of the 1965 New South Wales state election
Candidates of the 1965 New South Wales state election

References

Members of New South Wales parliaments by term
20th-century Australian politicians